Philippe Gimbert (born Firminy, 20 March 1966) is a former French rugby union player and coach. He played as a prop.

Gimbert first played at Lyon and ASM Clermont Ferrand. He later would play for Biarritz Olympique (1988/89-1989/90), CA Bordeaux-Bègles Gironde (1990/91-1995/96), US Dax (1996/97), Stade Français (1997/98-1998/99) and Union Bordeaux-Bègles (1999/2000-2000/01), where he finished his player career. He won the French Championship for Bordeaux-Bègles, in 1990/91, and for Stade Français, in 1997/98.

He had 4 caps for France, from 1991 to 1992, being scoreless. He was called for the 1991 Rugby World Cup, but never played. He played 2 times at the 1992 Five Nations Championship.

He was the coach of Bordeaux-Bêgles for two seasons, from 2001/02 to 2002/03, after finishing his player career. He wasn't able to avoid relegation to the Pro D2 and quit soon.

Honours
 Stade Français
French Rugby Union Championship/Top 14: 1997–98

References

External links
Philippe Gimbert International Statistics

People from Firminy
1966 births
Living people
French rugby union players
France international rugby union players
French rugby union coaches
Rugby union props
Sportspeople from Loire (department)
Biarritz Olympique players
ASM Clermont Auvergne players
CA Bordeaux-Bègles Gironde players
Stade Français players
US Dax players